Chukwuebuka Obi-Uchendu  (born 14 July 1982) is a Nigerian lawyer and media personality from Okija in Anambra State, Nigeria. He is known for hosting the reality show Big Brother Naija, the long running Rubbin' Minds talk show on Channels TV as well as co-hosting The Spot and Men's Corner on Ebonylife television. He is an ambassador for Budweiser Nigeria, Samsung Nigeria, PorkMoney, and 2Sure Nigeria.

Obi-Uchendu has received several award nominations and won the award for Outstanding TV Presenter of the Year at the Nigerian Broadcasters Merit Awards for his work on Rubbin' Minds.

Early life and education 
Born in Benin City, Edo State to a banker father and a mother who is a nurse, he is the third of four children with an elder sister as well as one older brother, and a younger brother. He went through with his nursery and primary education in the mid-western Nigerian city of Benin, remarkably passing the Common Entrance Examination into secondary school from Primary Four. He subsequently moved to the capital city of Abuja with his family.

He had his secondary education at Christ The King College Abuja, graduating in 1997, before getting his university education at the University of Abuja, up until 2004. He proceeded to the Nigerian Law School Bwari, Abuja finishing in 2005 he then returned to school after a 5-year working gap, graduating in December 2010 from the Washington College of Law of the American University Washington D.C., with Master of Laws degree specializations in Intellectual Property as well as Communications law from the Law and Government program.

Career

Big Brother and beyond
In 2006, he went in as one of an eventual 14 housemates on the first season of the popular reality show Big Brother Nigeria, finishing in eighth place. To date, he is one of the most visibly successful BBN 2006 cast members. In January 2017, he was announced as the host of the second season of Big Brother Naija as well as the third season.

After the reality show in 2006, he signed endorsement deals with a major telecommunications brand as well as a popular brewing company and as such hosted Friend or Foe on NTA, the GLO Show, also on NTA, as well as Guinness' Greatness TV.
He also maintained a weekly column called Contrast with a Nigerian national daily newspaper, This Day. 

In the run up to the 2011 general elections in Nigeria, he hosted the first ever presidential debate focused on youth issues, which was broadcast live across Nigeria.

Rubbin Minds and EbonyLife TV
In 2013, producers of Rubbin' Minds, a Nigerian television talk-show, announced that Obi-Uchendu would be the new host.

In 2013, Obi-Uchendu became one of the co-hosts of The Spot, a TV show on DSTV, alongside Lamide Akintobi and Zainab Balogun.

In July 2016, he became the host of Men's Corner'', Nigeria's first all male TV talk show.

Ahead of the Big Brother Naija Season 5 reunion, a few fans called for Ebuka Obi-Uchendu to step aside as host. But the greater number of fans and celebrities defended the host's performance so far.

Filmography

Awards and recognition

Personal life 
On 15 April 2015 Ebuka got engaged to Cynthia Obianodo in Lagos. They got married on 6 February 2016 in Abuja. On 8 November 2016, they welcomed a daughter. In 2018 they announced they were expecting another child via Instagram. Cynthia once said she met her husband, Ebuka on Twitter.

See also
 List of Igbo people
 List of Nigerian media personalities

References

1982 births
Living people
Big Brother (franchise) contestants
Igbo people
Nigerian television personalities
Nigerian television presenters
Nigerian media personalities
People from Anambra State
Nigerian lawyers